Taimuraz Tigiyev (born 15 January 1982 in Vladikavkaz) is a Russian-Kazakhstani wrestler from Moscow of Ossetian origin. He initially won a silver medal at the 2008 Summer Olympics. In 2016, he was stripped of his Olympic medal after a retest of his doping sample tested positive for steroids.

At the 2012 Summer Olympics, he lost in the second round to Abdusalam Gadisov of Russia.

References

External links
 

1982 births
Living people
Kazakhstani people of Ossetian descent
Kazakhstani male sport wrestlers
Olympic wrestlers of Kazakhstan
Wrestlers at the 2008 Summer Olympics
Wrestlers at the 2012 Summer Olympics
Asian Games medalists in wrestling
Wrestlers at the 2006 Asian Games
Wrestlers at the 2010 Asian Games
Competitors stripped of Summer Olympics medals
Doping cases in wrestling
Kazakhstani sportspeople in doping cases
Asian Games bronze medalists for Kazakhstan
Medalists at the 2006 Asian Games
Sportspeople from Vladikavkaz